Pteronotus is a genus of bats. Eight extant species have been recognized, as well as one relatively recently extinct species.

References

 Gutierrez, E.E. & Molinari, J. 2008. Morphometrics and taxonomy of bats of the genus Pteronotus (subgenus Phyllodia) in Venezuela. Journal of Mammalogy 89(2): 292–305.

 
Bat genera
Taxa named by John Edward Gray